Dąbrowa is a Polish coat of arms originated from the Duchy of Masovia.

Notable bearers
Notable bearers of this coat of arms include:

Kostka family
 Katarzyna Kostka
 Jan Kostka
 Stanisław Kostka
 Saint Stanislaus Kostka
Kiszka family
 Barbara Kiszka (?–1513), wife of Jerzy Radziwiłł
 Jan Kiszka (1552–1592), castellan of Wilno and voivode of Brześć 
 Stanisław Kiszka (1584-1626), bishop of Samogitia
 Janusz Kiszka (1600–1653), voivode and hetman, last of the family
Ciechanowiecki family 
 Andrzej Ciechanowiecki, art historian, philanthropist, art collector, antique dealer, antiquarian, founder of the Ciechanowiecki Foundation

See also
 Polish heraldry
 Heraldic family
 List of Polish nobility coats of arms

Bibliography

 Bartosz Paprocki. Herby rycerstwa polskiego. Kraków, 1584.
 Simon Okolski. Orbis Polonus. Kraków, 1642. T.1-3.
 Ks. Kacper Niesiecki. Herby i familie rycerskie tak w Koronie jako y w W.X.L. Lwów, 1728.
 Tadeusz Gajl: Herbarz polski od średniowiecza do XX wieku : ponad 4500 herbów szlacheckich 37 tysięcy nazwisk 55 tysięcy rodów. L&L, 2007, s. 406–539. .

External links
 http://pl.wikisource.org/wiki/Encyklopedia_staropolska/D%C4%85browa

Polish coats of arms